The 2005 Bonnaroo Music Festival took place from June 10–12, and more than 75,000 people were in attendance.  New Line Cinema introduced a twenty-four-hour "cinema tent," showing popular and cult films.  Wireless Internet access was provided by Cisco Systems.  There was a "comedy tent" featuring Jim Breuer as well as some lesser-known comedians and even daily yoga classes. Like 2004, rain marked each day of the festival. The children's area was provided by Kidz Jam.

Lineup

June 9th

Perpetual Groove
Gabby La La
Signal Path

June 10th
(artists listed from earliest to latest set times)

What Stage:
Alison Krauss and Union Station
The Allman Brothers Band
Dave Matthews Band
Which Stage:
Joss Stone
Jurassic 5
Herbie Hancock's Headhunters 2005
This Tent:
Old Crow Medicine Show
Peter Rowan & Crucial Reggae
John Prine
Bela Fleck's Acoustic Trio
Galactic's Crewe De Carnivale
That Tent:
Ollabelle
The Gourds
Drive-By Truckers
Benevento/Russo Duo featuring Mike Gordon
Saul Williams
The Mars Volta
RJD2
The Other Tent:
Josh Ritter
Joanna Newsom
Madeleine Peyroux
Brazilian Girls
STS9
The Bonnaroo Comedy Theatre:
Alexandra McHale
Cinema Tent:
Cowboy Jack Clement's Home Movies
Chappelle Show
Garden State
Friday
Monty Python's Life of Brian
DiG!
Star Wars: Episode II – Attack of the Clones
The Bourne Identity
Airplane!
Team America: World Police
Pink Flamingos

June 11th
(artists listed from earliest to latest set times)

What Stage:
Ozomatli
Gov't Mule
The Black Crowes
Widespread Panic
Which Stage:
22-20's
Kings of Leon
Yonder Mountain String Band
Jack Johnson
Trey Anastasio
This Tent:
Assembly of Dust
Mouse on Mars
Particle
Keller Williams (WMD's)
Béla Fleck Acoustic Trio
Karl Denson's Tiny Universe
That Tent:
The Frames
M. Ward
Rilo Kiley
Iron & Wine
The Perceptionists
De La Soul
The Other Tent:
Tea Leaf Green
Blue Merle
Xavier Rudd
O.A.R.
Ray Lamontagne
The Secret Machines
DJ Krush
The Bonnaroo Comedy Theatre:
Mark Eddie
Mike Birbiglia
Godfrey
Jim Breuer
Pete Correale
Mark Eddie
Vic Henley
Blue Room Café:
Alexandra Scott
Brandi Carlile
Brett Dennen
Dishwater Blonde
Jim Lauderdale
Jodie Manross
Mic Harrison
Mile 8
Old Union
Outformation
Trent Dabbs
Will Hoge
Cinema Tent:
Family Guy
Napoleon Dynamite
Caddyshack
Stella
Coming to America
Mike Tyson vs. Kevin McBride
Minority Report
Kill Bill: Volume 1
Friday the 13th

June 12th
(artists listed from earliest to latest set times)

What Stage:
Toots and the Maytals
Bob Weir and RatDog
The Word
Widespread Panic
Which Stage:
Umphrey's McGee
My Morning Jacket
Modest Mouse
This Tent:
Matisyahu
Citizen Cope
John Butler Trio
Earl Scruggs and Friends
That Tent:
Amos Lee
Heartless Bastards
Kermit Ruffins and the Barbeque Swingers
The Other Tent:
Dr. Dog
Keren Ann
Lake Trout
Donna the Buffalo
Cinema Tent:
South Park: Bigger, Longer & Uncut
Raising Arizona
Austin Powers: The Spy Who Shagged Me
Beanland: Rising From the Riverbed
Bill Cosby: Himself
2005 NBA Finals Game Two

Superjam
(Core band members only, guests not included)

Herbie Hancock (keyboard), Pino Palladino (bass), Ahmir “Questlove” Thompson (drums), Lionel Loueke (guitar)

References

Bonnaroo Music Festival by year
2005 in American music
2005 music festivals
2005 in Tennessee
Bonnaroo